The 1997–98 UCLA Bruins men's basketball team represented the University of California, Los Angeles in the 1997–98 NCAA Division I men's basketball season.  The team finished 3rd in the conference.  The Bruins competed in the 1998 NCAA Division I men's basketball tournament, losing to the Kentucky Wildcats in the sweet sixteen.  This was the second season for head coach Steve Lavin. Seniors Toby Bailey, J.R. Henderson, and Kris Johnson were honored as the team's co-Most Valuable Players. Johnson led UCLA in scoring with an 18.4 average, 21.1 in Pac-10 play. Baron Davis was the prize recruit of the incoming freshman class. Fellow Los Angeles prep star Schea Cotton had also committed to UCLA, but the NCAA invalidated his SAT scores, and he was not allowed to enroll.

Roster

Schedule

|-
!colspan=9 style=|Exhibition

|-
!colspan=9 style=|Regular Season

|-
!colspan=9 style=| NCAA tournament

Source

References

Ucla
UCLA Bruins men's basketball seasons
NCAA
NCAA
Ucla